This is a list of the National Register of Historic Places listings in Franklin County, Maine.

This is intended to be a complete list of the properties and districts on the National Register of Historic Places in Franklin County, Maine, United States. Latitude and longitude coordinates are provided for many National Register properties and districts; these locations may be seen together in a map.

There are 47 properties and districts listed on the National Register in the county.  Two properties were once listed, but have been removed.

Current listings

|}

Former listings

|}

See also

 List of National Historic Landmarks in Maine
 National Register of Historic Places listings in Maine

References

Franklin
Franklin County, Maine